The Campeonato Brasileiro Série A is the professional association football league of Brazil. This is a list of Brasileirão Série A winning football managers. Including since 1959, after the unification of the champions of the Torneio Roberto Gomes Pedrosa and Taça Brasil.

The record for most titles is shared by two managers who won five each. Lula won five consecutively for Santos from 1961 to 1965. Vanderlei Luxemburgo won five with Palmeiras (1993, 1994), Corinthians (1998), Cruzeiro (2003) and Santos (2004).

Only two foreigners have won the title: Argentine Carlos Volante for Bahia in the debut season in 1959, and Portuguese Jorge Jesus for Flamengo in 2019.

Seasons and winning managers

References

Campeonato Brasileiro Série A
Brasileiro Serie A